Grants Pass Airport , is a public airport located five miles (8 km) northwest of the city of Grants Pass in Josephine County, Oregon, United States.

Cargo carriers

Airport communications

References

External links

Airports in Josephine County, Oregon
Grants Pass, Oregon